Yun Kwan (1 April 1935 – 14 November 2022) was a South Korean lawyer and judge. He served as Chief Justice of the Supreme Court of Korea from 1993 to 1999.

Yun died on 14 November 2022, at the age of 87.

References

1935 births
2022 deaths
South Korean lawyers
Chief justices of the Supreme Court of Korea
Justices of the Supreme Court of Korea
People from South Jeolla Province